Silvia Sperber (born 9 February 1965) is a female German sports shooter. She competed at the 1984, 1988 and 1992 Olympics in five events in total, and won a gold and a silver medal in 1988.

Olympic results

References

1965 births
German female sport shooters
ISSF rifle shooters
Olympic shooters of West Germany
Olympic shooters of Germany
Shooters at the 1984 Summer Olympics
Shooters at the 1988 Summer Olympics
Shooters at the 1992 Summer Olympics
Olympic gold medalists for West Germany
Olympic silver medalists for West Germany
Living people
Olympic medalists in shooting

Medalists at the 1988 Summer Olympics